Louis Charles Baillon (5 August 1881 – 9 September 1965) was an English field hockey player, who won a gold medal with the Great Britain team at the 1908 Summer Olympics.

Personal life
Louis Baillon was born in Stanley, Falkland Islands at the house of his grandmother, Julia Williams. His father, Louis Augustine Baillon emigrated to the Falklands in the mid-1800s to become a sheep farmer. In 1888, he and his family returned to England and settled in Northamptonshire.

In 1910, Louis married Mildred Isobel Green and they had 5 children together. He then joined the Royal Army Service Corps in 1914 and saw service in France during World War I and later left the army in 1920. After leaving the army, Baillon joined the Phipps Northampton Brewery Company where he rose to the rank of director.

During World War II, two of Louis's sons, Paul and Mark were killed in action during the Battle of Britain.

Sports career and later life
When Louis and his family returned to England, he established himself as an excellent sportsman excelling at hockey, football, and tennis. Baillon played as a full-back for England men's national field hockey team at the 1908 Summer Olympics in London. The team subsequently won their first and only gold medal to date making him the only Falkland Islander to win a gold medal at the Olympics.

Louis played football at Wandsworth AFC and was still a member of the Northants County Lawn Tennis at the age of 50. He would ultimately remain in Northamptonshire for the rest of his life. Louis died aged 84 on 9 September 1965.

References

External links
 

1881 births
1965 deaths
English male field hockey players
Field hockey players at the 1908 Summer Olympics
Olympic field hockey players of Great Britain
British male field hockey players
Olympic gold medallists for Great Britain
Falkland Islands sportspeople
People from Brixworth
People from Fox Bay
Olympic medalists in field hockey
English Olympic medallists
Falkland Islands sportsmen
Medalists at the 1908 Summer Olympics
Royal Army Service Corps officers
British Army personnel of World War I
People from Stanley, Falkland Islands